The neutron electric dipole moment (nEDM), denoted dn, is a measure for the distribution of positive and negative charge inside the neutron. A finite electric dipole moment can only exist if the centers of the negative and positive charge distribution inside the particle do not coincide. So far, no neutron EDM has been found.

Theory 

A permanent electric dipole moment of a fundamental particle violates both parity (P) and time reversal symmetry (T). These violations can be understood by examining the neutron's magnetic dipole moment and hypothetical electric dipole moment. Under time reversal, the magnetic dipole moment changes its direction, whereas the electric dipole moment stays unchanged. Under parity, the electric dipole moment changes its direction but not the magnetic dipole moment. As the resulting system under P and T is not symmetric with respect to the initial system, these symmetries are violated in the case of the existence of an EDM. Having also CPT symmetry, the combined symmetry CP is violated as well.

Standard Model prediction 
As it is depicted above, in order to generate a finite nEDM one needs processes that violate CP symmetry. CP violation has been observed in weak interactions and is included in the Standard Model of particle physics via the CP-violating phase in the CKM matrix. However, the amount of CP violation is very small and therefore also the contribution to the nEDM: .

Matter–antimatter asymmetry 

From the asymmetry between matter and antimatter in the universe, one suspects that there must be a sizeable amount of CP-violation. Measuring a neutron electric dipole moment at a much higher level than predicted by the Standard Model would therefore directly confirm this suspicion and improve our understanding of CP-violating processes.

Strong CP problem 

As the neutron is built up of quarks, it is also susceptible to CP violation stemming from strong interactions. Quantum chromodynamics – the theoretical description of the strong force – naturally includes a term that breaks CP-symmetry. The strength of this term is characterized by the angle θ. The current limit on the nEDM constrains this angle to be less than 10−10 radians. This fine-tuning of the angle θ, which is naturally expected to be of order 1, is the strong CP problem.

SUSY CP problem 
Supersymmetric extensions to the Standard Model, such as the Minimal Supersymmetric Standard Model, generally lead to a large CP-violation. As in the case of the strong interaction, the limit on the neutron EDM is already constraining the CP violating phases. The fine-tuning is, however, not as severe yet.

Experimental technique 
In order to extract the neutron EDM, one measures the Larmor precession of the neutron spin in the presence of parallel and antiparallel magnetic and electric fields. The precession frequency for each of the two cases is given by

,

the addition or subtraction of the frequencies stemming from the precession of the magnetic moment around the magnetic field and the precession of the electric dipole moment around the electric field. From the difference of those two frequencies one readily obtains a measure of the neutron EDM:

The biggest challenge of the experiment (and at the same time the source of the biggest systematic false effects) is to ensure that the magnetic field does not change during these two measurements.

History 

The first experiments searching for the electric dipole moment of the neutron used beams of thermal (and later cold) neutrons to conduct the measurement. It started with the experiment by James Smith, Purcell, and Ramsey in 1951 (and published in 1957) at ORNL’s Graphite Reactor (as the three researchers were from Harvard University, this experiment is called ORNL/Harvard or something similar, see figure in this section), obtaining a limit of  Beams of neutrons were used until 1977 for nEDM experiments. At this point, systematic effects related to the high velocities of the neutrons in the beam became insurmountable.

After that, experiments with ultracold neutrons (UCN) took over. This experiment and especially the experiment starting in 1984 at the Institut Laue-Langevin (ILL) pushed the limit down by another two orders of magnitude yielding the best upper limit in 2006, revised in 2015.

During these 70 years of experiments, six orders of magnitude have been covered, thereby putting stringent constraints on theoretical models.

The latest best limit of  has been published 2020 by the nEDM collaboration at Paul Scherrer Institute (PSI).

Current experiments 

 n2EDM of the nEDM collaboration under construction at the UCN source at the Paul Scherrer Institute. In February 2022 the apparatus was being set up at PSI, and commissioning with neutrons expected in late 2022. The apparatus is expected to reach sensitivity of  after 500 days of operation.
 UCN nEDM experiment under construction at TRIUMF
 nEDM@SNS experiment under construction (as of 2022) at the Spallation Neutron Source
 PNPI nEDM experiment awaiting operation approval at the Institut Laue-Langevin
 PanEDM experiment being built at the Institut Laue-Langevin
 Cryogenic neutron EDM experiment stopped at the Institut Laue-Langevin

See also
 Electron electric dipole moment

References

Electric dipole moment
Electromagnetism
Particle physics